New Zion is an unincorporated community located in northeastern Jackson County, Kentucky, United States. The community is located on Kentucky Route 587, 6 miles northeast of McKee and 3 miles south of Arvel. In the community is New Zion Ridge. 

A post office was established in the community in 1942, but it was closed in 1981.

References

Unincorporated communities in Jackson County, Kentucky
Unincorporated communities in Kentucky